Davit Lokyan  (Դավիթ Լոքյան; born: January 20, 1958) is an Armenian politician. He served as the Minister of Territorial Administration and Development of Armenia from 2016 to 2018.

Biography 
He was born on January 20, 1958, in Ninotsminda, Soviet Georgia. 

 Positions held
 1998-1999 - Deputy Governor of Lori Region.
 May 30, 1999 - Elected Member of Parliament. Member of the Standing Committee on Fiscal, Credit and Economic Affairs. Head of the ARF faction.
 2001-2003 - was the Minister of Urban Development of Armenia.
 2003-2008 - Minister of Agriculture of Armenia.
 On February 24, 2016, by the decree of the President of Armenia, he was appointed Minister of Territorial Administration and Development of Armenia.
 On April 19, 2018, Lokyan became the Minister of Territorial Administration and Development of Armenia in the government of Serzh Sargsyan. On April 23, as a result of protests, Sargsyan left office and Karen Karapetyan became prime minister, while Lokyan remained in his post as acting. Three days later David Lokyan submitted his resignation.

Awards 
 Anania Shirakatsi Medal
 Vachagan Barepasht Medal
 Armenian Prime Minister's Commemorative Medal

See also 
 Karapetyan government
 Abrahamyan government
 Second Serzh Sargsyan government

References 

1958 births
Living people
Members of the National Assembly (Armenia)
Government ministers of Armenia
Armenian Revolutionary Federation politicians
21st-century Armenian politicians
Armenian politicians